Yipunu also known as Yisira is a Bantu language spoken in the Republic of Gabon and the Republic of Congo by several thousand people, mainly of the Punu and Ghisir ethnic groups, the largest of the four major ethnic groups in Gabon. Yipunu has about 120 thousand native speakers, mainly from the southern Region, including 8 thousand speakers in southern French Congo. It is classified as B.43 in the Guthrie classification.

Lexicon

Below is a lexicon from the "Parlons Yipunu", collected by Mabik-ma-Kombil.

A = he/she

Agunyi = where? 

Agunenyi = who is it?

Agon = over there 

Agunu = here (to here) 

Amumu = in there 

Amune = over there 

Ani = who, which one? 

Anàne = it's like that, that's it 

Avene = there 

Avave = here 

Avenyi/Avè = where

Ba = they 

Babàke = cut quickly 

Babàse = fill quickly

Babile = to burn 

Babule = flambé (an animal) 

Bagule = find 

Bagunu = to resemble 

Bagusunu = find a resemblance 

Bale = to ventilate, to clear away
 
Bali = day

Balile = shine

Bambige = to tighten

Bande = start

Bande = bottom

Bandebulongu = South

Bandekubu = lower abdomen 

Bandige = to bend 

Bandimine = to cover 

Banganga = rootworkers

Banyigebibogu = May to June

Banze = turn on 

Bare = to mount, to climb 

Base = fill 

Batile = to engulf, to swallow 

Bé = forked tongue 

Bebeli = very close to 

Bèfule = to chip 

Bège = carry, bring 

Bèkule = initiate

Bele = to be sick 

Beli = near, close to 

Beluse = to heal 

Bembe = touch 

Bémbige = to rock, to console 

Bèngusunu = going to meet a third party 

Beruse = to bring down 

Bète = to overthrow 

Bètse = watching over a sick person 

Biale = to be promoted 

Bibeji = 2

Bige = to predict misfortune 

Bike = miss, absent

Bikumbu = despicable behavior 

Bikumbu = news 

Bileli = a cry to implore

Bilongu = remedies, medicine
 
Bindige = lock

Bine = 4

Binge = pursue 

Bingulu = bad habits 

Birambi = suspicion

Biranu = 5

Birieri/Bitatu = 3

Bisiamunu = 6

Bisiemu = potions

Biswasu = speed 

Bituti = dirty water

Bitoli = problems 

Bivatile = stubbornness 

Boke = kill 

Bokise = losing a parent 

Bole = pick up 

Bonge = to take 

Boti = good 

Botse = to wet, soak 

Bubitu = gums 

Budige = to block, to obstruct a path 

Budilu = iron 

Budungu = to divine

Buji = honey 

Buge = heal 

Bukanyi = wickedness 

Bukéti = skill 

Bukongu = power 

Bukulu = tradition 

Bule = to break 

Bulagu = madness 

Bumbe = to shape 

Bumbe = to kiss 

Bundesti = babysitting 

Bundumbe = authority, power, wealth 

Bure = to give birth 

Burele = hunting 

Buse = refuse

Busine = wealth 

Butambe = Earth 

Buvèdi = teasing 

Buvuandi = beauty

Bwage = throw

Bwagene = to lament in a group 

Bwali = evil, disease 

Bwange = to weave 

Bwatu = canoe 

Bwèjise = to make beautiful or good 

Bwèle = to add 

Bwile = to bathe

Dabule = withdraw 

Dage = steal, theft

Dedi = similarly 

Dédile = to obey 

Dèkise = to pour drop by drop 

Devise = nod of the head

Dibabe = mute 

Dibage = knife 

Dibaku = misstep 

Dibale = man, male

Dibàle = umbrella

Dibàndu = beginning

Dibandu = game trap 

Dibange = play 

Dibagu = fever

Dibanzi = temple, place of initiatory worship 

Dibéji = annoyance, mockery

Dibèri = drop (of water, blood, rain) 

Dibi = bad deed 

Dibufu = ash 

Dibule = to open 

Dibume = projectile

Dibundu = assembly

Difube = bulb

Difubu = hem 

Difutu = old plantation 

Difuitse = moss

Dige = kaolin, a clay mineral

Digale = coal 

Digeru = actions of a baby

Digebu = wink 

Digengi = abundance 

Digobe = respect 

Digogu = clay 

Digosu = beverage mixed with breast milk 

Diguki = heap 

Digumbi = ship 

Dijodigeyi = November to December

Dijodineni = January to February 

Dikabu = part 

Dikibise = teasing, annoyance 

Dikimbe = initiatory badge 

Dikongu = spear 

Dikube = forge, blacksmith

Dikuku = bark 

Dikule = to measure

Dikumbi = plane, rocket

Dikunde = dove 

Dikundu = sorcery

Dikutu = pole 

Dilàbuge = stopper 

Dilambe = dance

Dilangi = drunkenness 

Dilènze = insolence 

Dilàgu = crazy 

Dile = win, succeed

Dilongi = advice

Dilute = hole

Dimanyi = stone, pebble, rock

Dimbe = to hit 

Dimbu = village 

Dimengidiwisi = twilight

Dimi = pregnancy 

Dimungi/Dungembi = fog 

Dingènde = shriveled thing or person

Dingènze = truth, true thing 

Dingibe = palm wine 

Dingundu = hip 

Dingungu = distinctive noise
 
Dinyiki = fly

Dingongu = metal box 

Dinonge = friendship 

Dinu = tooth 

Dipaku = branch fork 

Dipalulu = exit 

Dipapi = bird's wing 

Dirambe = swamp, marsh

Dirangi = booty cheek

Dironde = concubine 

Dirugeme = sweat 

Disabu = landing stage 

Disale = dew

Disambeke = shoulder 

Disambi = razor 

Disàngu = lung 

Disite = knot of a rope 

Disiere = epilepsy 

Disonge = adultery

Disu = eye 

Ditage = tadpole 

Ditase = thought 

Ditebugulu'diwisi = dawn

Ditéji = saliva 

Ditèngu = returning 

Ditodi = stain 

Ditsange = tear 

Ditsatselangi = audacity 

Ditsutse = crest of a bird 

Ditu = leech 

Dituji = ear 

Ditumbe = fight 

Divare = good harvest

Divase = twin 

Divembili = gust of wind with rain
 
Divènde = baldness 

Divesi = flank, beside, on one side

Divilu = shaved head

Divesu = hate

Divite = war, fight

Divule = city 

Divumbu = boil 

Divuvu = throat 

Diwavi = jealousy 

Diwanzi = high forest of branches

Diwèle = marriage 

Diweme = disobedience

Diwèru = hour

Dobule = to remove 

Dodise = to comment 

Dodimine = to examine 

Doke = to pick

Dokimine = observe from afar 

Dokule = to pick 

Donze = deepen 

Dore = to dream 

Dubabele = stuttering

Dubambe = rattan, a plant used to make furniture 

Dubile = pit 

Dubongu = raffia fabric 

Dufu = death 

Dufunu = price 

Dugaji = leaf 

Dugane = scabies pustule, type of disease or infestation

Dugange = trap barrier 

Dugélu = gossip 

Dugongi = eyelash 

Dugoru = toad 

Dugugeme = stuttering 

Dugunge = flat rock slab 

Dugungu = imprecatory insult 

Duguve = animal tick 

Duke = follow

Dukabonu = pangolin 

Dukande = insomnia 

Dukonduku/Dilobe = hook 

Dukuji = flying squirrel 

Dulombili = village square, courtyard 

Dumbulu = green

Dumise = glorify, boast 

Dumuge = jump, leap 

Dumwènu = mirror 

Dunangu = pride 

Dunangu = talk in a loud, aggressive manner with little effect

Dungwène = chameleon

Dure = drink

Duru = spoon 

Durundu = red fruit 

Dusale = feather 

Dusambu = prayer 

Dusavu = tale, fable 

Dusongu = point 

Dusosu = splinter 

Dusugi = hawk 

Dusièndi = thorn 

Dute = to shoot 

Dutsi = sneeze 

Dutsole = scissors 

Duvèsi = cockroach

Dwale = nail, claw 

Dwèngu = pot

Fife = to suck 

Fike = drink by filtering the liquid between the teeth 

Fube = mix 

Fuge = cut hair 

Fumu'Nzambi/Fumunzambi = God, supreme being 

Funde = accuse, denounce 

Funde = digging 

Fundu = confabulation

Fure = to lie 

Fute = pay, spit 

Fwale = France 

Fwate = go through the small bush

Fwèngilile = to slander, to accuse unjustly 

Fwère = to draw, to pick up

Fwimbe = share unequally 

Fwinyi = tighten by pulling 

Fwiri = boredom, annoyance

Gabe = to share 

Gabuge = to return 

Gabuse = to give back 

Gake = to bite 

Galene = to dispute an object 

Game = squeeze, wring 

Gamuge = to shout 

Gandise = to prohibit 

Gànge =  to catch, seize

Gange = fry, roast 

Gari = in the middle of

Gariwisi = midnight

Gebule = to wink, to step 

Getubulongu = West

Gobise = respect 

Gobule = to spit out

Golile = to wash, to rub oil 

Golule = to shell, to tear 

Gome = fear, dread

Gombe = to scrape, scrape 

Gonge = bypass 

Gore = to warm up 

Gorule = to scratch 

Gubene = to hit 

Gubule = dust, brush 

Gudige = return 

Gufise = to shorten

Gukulile = to imitate, to reproduce 

Gulu = ancient, old 

Gulu = to hear, to listen 

Gumbe = moan, roar, growl 

Gumbe = to cover, surround
 
Gumbesne = to kiss, to embrace 

Gumuse = to dry

Ibalu = tree bark

Ibambe = white man 

Ibadu = clan 

Ibedu = sick 

Ibinde = bad luck 

Ibindi = corpse, remains 

Ibonge = turtle 

Ibotsi = rot 

Iburu = parent 

Ibusi = sister 

Idibutsu = lid 

Idube = net 

Idume = danger 

Idumbitsi = shadow 

Idumi = thunderclap 

Idumuimfule = tornado

Idune = hole, cavity, cavern
 
Idwaru = garment 

Ifu = 9

Ifufu = crumb, poor 

Ifulu = steam bath 

Ifwale = French language 

Ifwinzi = poultry crop 

Igabe = punch 

Igare = crate, trunk, suitcase

Igume = speech, word

Igumi/Digumi = 10

Igungule'tubi = flooding of a river 

Ikadi = bridge

Ikaji = corpse

Ikambi = performer

Ikari = fall 

Ikémbi = dwarf

Ikènzi = cricket

Ikibe = shortness of breath

Ikoku = bump

Ikoku = dance of rejoicing

Ikotige = penknife

Ikoyi = disabled, paraplegic

Ikuku = cooking

Ikumbu = fine

Ilange = elephant trunk

Ilèke = source, origin

Ileme = time, moment 

Ilengi = child

Ilibe = oblivion, nothingness 

Ilime = year 

Ilimbe = mark 

Ilindi = raft

Ilinge = cassock, robe 

Ilingilingi = the center of the world

Ilombi = short story

Ilumbi = message 

Ilumbu = day

Ilunge = earring

Image = supernatural event

Imomonyi = firefly

Imosi = 1

Inane = 8

Inde = will-o'-the-wisp

Ingange = church

Ingidi = small xylophone

Ingume = sterile 

Inombu = troop, herd 

Inyunyi = soul, spirit 

Inunu = elder, old man

Ipèle = plate

Ipunge = bat

Ipupu = peeling

Irèle = size 

Irèndi = piece of cloth

Irure = vial 

Isage = cluster of fruits

Isalu = work, profession, task

Isambwali = 7

Isange = jug, jar

Isangomu = letter

Isindu = pollarded tree trunk

Isinge = grass

Isinzi = pointed stump

Isièmu = remedies

Isièngu = insult

Isièyi = sand 

Isombule = way of wearing the loincloth

Isonyi = shame

Isupu = sheath 

Isusube = bladder

Iswasu = cold

Iswisu = staring 

Itale = smokehouse

Itande = market

Itengi = mask, shard, shell 

Itsatse = caterpillar 

Itsibe = deep water 

Itsige = seat, bed 

Itsubi = rainy season

Itumbe = image, engraving, statue 

Itunzi = stupid 

Itutu = bulrush torch

Ivaru = plant 

Ivele = fast 

Iviovi = hat, cap

Jabe = to know

Ji = to eat

Jibe = gluttony

Julunzambi/Julu'nzambi = sky

Kabu = anger 

Kafi = paddle 

Kage = grandfather, grandmother

Kaki = lightning 

Kale = crab

Kambe = missing something 

Kange = guinea fowl 

Kangi = fire 

Katsi = maternal uncle

Kédi = morning 

Kégèngi = fresh 

Kekigangi/Igangi = short dry season

Kekitsubi = short rainy season

Kèle = to wait 

Kèlise = to keep 

Kibe = to cover 

Kibise = to annoy, to tease

Kile = to iron

Kingu = neck

Kobi = bag

Kobige = to hang 

Kokolu = sorry 

Kondini = in vain, uselessly 

Kôngu = jar, clay jug 

Kongu = river antelope 

Kosi = effigy or statue of a deity

Kote = to enter

Kotise = to bring in 

Kugumfu = dust 

Kuke = to sow 

Kumbu = motto, mantra

Kunge = copper 

Kuñi = deprivation of meat 

Kuru = armpit

Kute = to surround

Kuteme = to kneel 

Kwalele = crosses 

Kwé/Kwényi = how much?

Labe = see
Lage = to sow 

Lambe = to cook

Lambi = lamp 

Lege = to spy

Lèle = rocking, caressing, raising a child

Lelévi = full, brim

Lélige = to take, to suspend 

Lémbige = to console, to soothe

Lèmbule = apply oil on an abscess, caress

Lènde = to beg 

Lènze = to despise

Lengule = examine contemplate 

Leve = make an oath

Lile = to cry 

Linge = traveling 

Lobe = fish

Lobuge = to step over, to cross 

Loge = bewitch, curse

Lubuge = to be clever, cunning, shrewd 

Lúge = vomit

Luge = name 

Lukule = to complete 

Longe = teach, promise

Mabale = right

Mabufu = ashes 

Madibe = deafness 

Madudumbi = clouds

Madungu = hernia 

Mafinyi = pus

Magetu = left 

Magunde = century, millennium
 
Make = sap 

Makengi = slime 

Makibu = pledge

Makiele = dawn

Malamu = palm wine 

Malémbi = hug

Malu = confluent, coming together of rivers 

Malumbi = praise to the ancestors 

Malungu = blood

Mambe = water 

Mambi = shit

Mane = finish 

Mange = snack

Mangele = dry season 

Mapémi =  threats 

Marangi/Dirangi = booty 

Masige = yesterday 

Masuku = claps 

Mate = to rise, to climb 

Matsi = oil 

Mbàlebulongu = East

Mbari = palm tree 

Mbatsi = friend, comrade 

Mbèle = wrong 

Mbémbu = voice 

Mbèngi = ravine, precipice 

Mbingu = food 

Mbugu = mouthful 

Mbùnge = crab shell 

Mbunge = smell 

Mbwélili = star

Mengu = sharp 

Mfubu = hippopotamus 

Mfule = rain

Mfumbi = deceased

Mfunge = to wrap oneself in a loincloth 

Mfwange = news of death 

Milolu = cries of joy 

Minzi = wolf-dog 

Mobutsi = savior 

Monyu = life 

Moru = ring 

Mubeji = 2nd

Mubiji = wave

Mubu = sea, ocean 

Mudodu = balance 

Mufu = 9th

Mufune = load 

Mufundu = complaint 

Mugamu = cry, howl 

Mugumi = 10th

Mukate = skin 

Mukolu = night 

Mukongu = hill, mountain 

Mukube = blacksmith 

Mukùbe = beak 

Mukubi = malevolence 

Mukwati = machete 

Mukwili = widower, widow 

Mule = blessing 

Mulingu = journey 

Mulumi = husband 

Mulutso = flame 

Mumbèngu = small canoe 

Mumbinge = stilt

Munaji = strophanthus poison 

Munane = 8th

Munangasunge = praying mantis

Mundumbe = notable, renown

Mungongu = musical bow 

Mungudi = tornado, whirlwind 

Munombi = black man 

Mupande = braid 

Mupume = year

Muranu = 5th

Murèle = hunter 

Murieru = 3rd

Murondu = eel 

Musabu = insolence

Musambwali = 7th

Musamu = short story 

Musande = umbrella 

Musiamunu = 6th

Musini = eyebrow 

Musiru = forest 

Musoli = fallow field 

Musolu = job, work 

Musongu = disease 

Musoñi = flesh, meat 

Musuge = permission

Musulu = boiled

Musungu = sugar cane 

Musièngi = large village 

Mutu = person, human 

Muvedi = scar is 

Muvèmbe = albino 

Muvige = slave 

Muvumu = breathing

Muweli = month

Muyame = rainbow 

Muyombu = perfume 

Mwaji = brother-in-law 

Mwane = child

Mwényi = visitor, stranger

Mwètse = moonlight 

Mwine = 4th

Mwinzi = filth, dirt

Na = with 

Nane = massage 

Nangule = to lift 

Ndami = comrade, friend 

Ndagu = hut, house 

Ndétsi = child's rocker 

Ndige = bait 

Ndike = small fish basket 

Ndilu = limit, border 

Nimbe = colour 

Ndele = a song which signifies an exchange between the living and the ancestors

Ndunge = reason 

Nemise = to hurt

Nènge = to learn 

Nèngile = to call 

Nesi = no 

Ngande = courtyard, village square
 
Ngangakosi = rootworker who traps sorcerers

Ngange/Nganga = traditional healer
 
Ngènge = centipede 

Ngo = panther, leopard 

Ngomfi = harp 

Ngombu = raffia 

Ngondi = flower 

Ngunge = bell 

Ngusu = jealousy 

Ngwangu = stick 

Nongu = proverb, parable 

Nwane = to borrow 

Nyangu = Sun

Nza = then

Nzale = hunger 

Nzile = path 

Nzime = back 

Nzobu = civet 

Nzontsi = judge 

Nzoruru = filth 

Nzumbili = smoke 

Nzwingiri = dragonfly

Page = resin

Pake = to square 

Pale = exit

Pambuge = to wander

Pari = pristine forest 

Pase = split 

Patula = to tear off 

Pembi = kaolin mineral

Penge = chin 

Pèni = nudity

Pinde = black

Pinze = alone, loneliness 

Pitse = to weigh 

Pube = mat 

Pugu = be patient 

Punge = wind 

Puni = murderer, thief who robs & kills in forests & mountains 

Pupe = spray, sprinkle 

Pupe = move

Puve = echo 

Pwanyi = width, breadth 

Pwasese = interval 

Pwele = many

Pwiti = hole, crevice

Rabile = to burn and leave a wound, to bite 

Rakule = to snatch 

Range = read 

Rangemine = to remember 

Rarige = to sew 

Régeme: tremble, shiver

Rine = flee, run away

Riri = red 

Rombe = to search 

Ronde = love 

Riabe = to cut (dead wood)

Sabi = key 

Sakulebibogu = March to April

Sale = to work

Sàle = choose 

Sambile = to pray 

Sàmbule = to present

Sanze = to drive out, to expel

Save = desire 

Sàve = to tell, talk about, denounce

Sibe = to sharpen

Sige = to play an instrument

Sike = to stall 

Simbe = to greet 

Sindige = to send

Sindile = to push

Singisile = to congratulate 

Sobene = to mix

Sole = clear 

Sopene = exchange 

Sube = to urinate 

Sumbe = buy, pay 

Sumbise = to sell 

Sumune = to defy a prohibition

Sundile = suddenly

Sunduge = go down

Sungesene = to oppose, parallel 

Suse = wash 

Swèkige = to strangle 

Sweme = to hide

Tabule = break, cut

Takule = start walking 

Tale = count

Tali = block of stone 

Tandige = to align 

Tandubulongu = North

Tapele = insolence 

Tase = to think 

Tate = dad, father 

Tate = to express pain 

Tege = 1st

Time = dig 

Timbuge = bend, be erect

Tinde = to send

Tsakule = to insult

Tsande = loincloth

Tsige = to bury

Tsimbu = to make a mistake

Tsindule = erase, wipe, dust

Tsingule = to say, to confess

Tsisige = evening, afternoon

Tsoke = to prick 

Tsoli = bird 

Tsone = week 

Tsongi = needle 

Tsugu = prison

Tsumbi = September to October

Tsune = to watch 

Tsunde = to discuss

Tsungi/Ngonde = Moon

Tsungule = to hurt 

Tsuve = calabash 

Tuge = surety, pledge

Tumbe = flying fast

Tumune = attack, provoke 

Tute = to accumulate, to amass

Va = there is 

Vage = to do

Vale = far

Vale = to cut 

Vande = spiritual artifacts

Vànde = to make mats, to braid 

Vàne = to pay, to reimburse

Vare = to plant

Vate = to be stubborn

Vatsi = on the ground

Vagusu = in front

Vege = give 

Veme = white, whiteness

Vend = lick

Vèngutse = except 

Vère = to shoot a gun

Veve = split 

Viluge = to bloom 

Vine = to hate

Viri = very, intensity

Vive = wait

Vole = smoking

Vombulu = open 

Vonde = ask 

Vondinivondini = nonchalantly

Vonu = very thin 

Vose = speak, say

Vove = to chat 

Vule = to undress, become nude 

Vume = to breathe 

Vunge = zero, nothing

Vuse = to spread, to exhale

Wabe = to fish 

Wabule = take food out of a pot 

Wake = to receive 

Wale = to extend 

Walule = tell a dream

Wamuse = to help

Wanzemwanzu = village chief 

Wèle = to marry

Wélige = try, compare 

Wème = to disobey

Wimbile = to sing 

Wisi = time 

Wivule = to ask

Yabutsu = door

Yangele = thirst

Yanzule = filter, sieve

Yari = side

Yasi = slice 

Yélu = measure 

Yévi = basket

Yèse = luck 

Yisasaku = July to August

Yotsi = cold

Yusile = heat

See also
Rimba language

References

Languages of Gabon
Sira languages
Languages of the Republic of the Congo